The Hohenfelder Mühlenau is a stream, about  long, in the district of Plön in northeast part of the North German state of Schleswig-Holstein.

The Hohenfelder Mühlenau is classified as a gravel-bedded stream. It begins at the Selenter See in Holstein and, together with the Salzau / Hagener Au, is one of its natural tailwaters.
This hurdle will now be bypassed, in line with the EU Water Framework Directive, using a drop structure (Sohlgleite) which will be built next to the existing building. The existing 50 hp Francis turbine is still an obstacle however.
At the end of its course the Hohenfelder Mühlenau discharges into the Baltic Sea with a water quality class of I-II.

See also
List of rivers of Schleswig-Holstein

Rivers of Schleswig-Holstein
Plön (district)
0Hohenfelder Mühlenau
Rivers of Germany